Leptotroga is a genus of moths of the family Erebidae. The genus was erected by George Hampson in 1926.

Lepidoptera and Some Other Life Forms now gives this name as a synonym of Papuacola Hampson, 1926.

Species
Leptotroga costalis (Moore, 1883) Samoa, Andamans
Leptotroga gemina (Fabricius, 1794) New Guinea, Sri Lanka

References

Calpinae
Noctuoidea genera